Gavin Packard (9 June 1964 – 18 May 2012) was an Indian actor of Irish American descent, noted for the villainous roles he portrayed in many Bollywood films of the 1990s like Sadak, Mohra, Tadipaar and Chamatkar. He had also acted in several Malayalam films like Aayushkalam, Season, Aanaval Mothiram and Aryan.

However, he left the industry in the early 2000s. He has also appeared in the 1989 Doordarshan Sci-fi Series Indradhanush.

Personal life 
He was the eldest of the five children of Earl and Barbara Packard. His father was a computer expert and his mother was a Konkani Maharashtrian. His grandfather John Packard was an Irish American who had come to Bangalore as a member of the US Army and chose to settle there. Packard was known for his physique and was a national and state award-winning bodybuilder. In Bollywood, he was a trainer to Sanjay Dutt, Sunil Shetty and Shera, Salman Khan's bodyguard.

Packard and his wife mutually separated.  Gavin has two daughters Erika Packard (elder) Kamille Kyla Packard (younger). Sanjay Dutt is the godfather of Kamille. His final years were spent with Daryl Packard, his younger brother, in Kalyan.

Death 
Packard died of respiratory disorder on 18 May 2012 and was buried at the St. Andrews Burial Grounds in Bandra the next day. Despite his long and notable cinematic career, the funeral was conspicuous by the absence of any representative from the film industry. As per the reports, Gavin had met with an accident while riding his bike at Kalyan Flower Market. He had got severely injured in that accident.

TV and music videos
 Shaktimaan (1998) (TV series) 
 Nagraj (2001) as Professor Naagmani  (Unaired TV Series)
 Cinderella (2004) (song from music album of the same name)

Film career
He made his debut onscreen through the Malayalam movie Aryan in 1988 in which he played the role of Martin, a local goon in Mumbai. His debut in Bollywood came in 1989 through Ilaaka. That year he also played the full length character of Fabien in P Padmarajan's Season, arguably his best cinematic performance. His last film was Yeh Hai Jalwa released in 2002 and directed by David Dhawan. He acted in nearly 60 films in Hindi and Malayalam in a career that spanned nearly 15 years.

Filmography

Hindi films
Jaani Dushman (2002) as Referee
Yeh Hai Jalwa (2002) as Man Hired To Beat Up Raju
Kranti (2002) as Shiva,Students College president 
Kunwara (2000) 
Hadh Kar Di Aapne (2000) as Tourist Guide of Europe 
Baaghi (2000) as Zandu Pathan
Kaala Samrajya (1999)
Nyaydaata (1999)
Maa Kasam (1999)
Shera (1999) as Brownie
Lo Main Aagaya (1999)
Pardesi Babu (1998) as Wrestler
Bade Miyan Chhote Miyan (1998) as (As Gavin)
Gharwali Baharwali (1998) as White Guy Beaten By Arjun Singh (As Gavin)
Sher-E-Hindustan (1998) as son of Choudhry
Qahar (1997) as (As Gavin)
Mrityudaata (1997) as Raja's Gang
Yeshwant (1997) as Salim's goon
Bhishma (1996) as Man Got Beaten By Bhola (As Gavin)
Shastra (1996) as Gavin (College Punk)
Khiladiyon Ka Khiladi (1996)
Ek Tha Raja (1996) as Gavin
Jurmana (1996) as Rona
Muqadar (1996) as Gavin
Vishwasghaat (1996) as Foreign Tiger
Gaddaar (1995) as Fighter (White Guy) (As Gavin)
Hulchul (1995) as Hitman
Janam Kundli (1995) as Goreybhai
Naajayaz (1995)
Karan Arjun (1995) as Boxer (As Gavin)
Aashique Mastane (1995) as Gavin
Jallaad (1995)
Hum Hain Bemisaal (1994)
Mohra (1994) as Mr Douglas
Naaraaz (1994)
Cheetah (1994) as Peter
Tadipaar (1993)...Maharaani henchman Dream sequence (Special Appearance)
Shatranj (1993) as Kevin
Waqt Hamara Hai (1993) as Sambo
Krishan Avtaar (1993) as Peter
Platform (1993) as Cheetah
Aankhen (1993) as Tejeshwar'S Henchman
Jaagruti (1993) as Shiva
Pehchaan (1993) as Yogi's henchman
Anaam (1992) as Pasha'S Henchman (Uncredited)
Deedar (1992) as (As Gavin)
Tirangaa (1992) as (Uncredited)
Qaid Mein Hai Bulbul (1992)
Chamatkar (1992) as Goonga
Jawaani (1984) as Drugs Peddler (Special Appearances)
Nafrat Ki Aandhi as He-Man (1988)
Na Insaafi (1989) as Tarzan
Kahan Hai Kanoon (1989) Raghu
Ilaaka (1989)
Tridev (1989) as Mr Dunhill
Thanedaar (1990) as Saudagar
Fateh (1991)
Patthar Ke Phool (1991) as Hitman (Uncredited)
Saathi (1991) as Chikna
Sadak (1991) as Maharani's Henchman

Malayalam

References

External links
 

Male actors in Malayalam cinema
Indian male film actors
Male actors in Hindi cinema
Indian people of Irish descent
2012 deaths
1964 births
20th-century Indian male actors
21st-century Indian male actors
Male actors from Maharashtra
People from Palghar district